Edward Flanders  may refer to:

Ed Flanders (1934–1995), American actor
Ned Flanders, character in The Simpsons